This is an alphabetical list of articles pertaining specifically to software engineering.

0–9
2D computer graphics —
3D computer graphics

A
Abstract syntax tree —
Abstraction —
Accounting software —
Ada —
Addressing mode —
Agile software development —
Algorithm —
Anti-pattern —
Application framework —
Application software —
Artificial intelligence —
Artificial neural network —
ASCII —
Aspect-oriented programming —
Assembler —
Assembly language —
Assertion —
Automata theory —
Automotive software —
Avionics software

B
Backward compatibility —
BASIC —
BCPL —
Berkeley Software Distribution —
Beta test —
Boolean logic —
Business software

C
C —
C++ —
C# —
CAD —
Canonical model —
Capability Maturity Model —
Capability Maturity Model Integration —
COBOL —
Code coverage —
Cohesion —
Compilers —
Complexity —
Computation —
Computational complexity theory —
Computer —
Computer-aided design —
Computer-aided manufacturing —
Computer architecture —
Computer bug —
Computer file —
Computer graphics —
Computer model —
Computer multitasking —
Computer programming —
Computer science —
Computer software —
Computer term etymologies —
Concurrent programming —
Configuration management —
Coupling —
Cyclomatic complexity

D
Data structure —
Data-structured language —
Database —
Dead code —
Decision table —
Declarative programming —
Design pattern —
Development stage —
Device driver —
Disassembler —
Disk image —
Domain-specific language

E
EEPROM —
Electronic design automation —
Embedded system —
Engineering —
Engineering model —
EPROM —
Even-odd rule —
Expert system —
Extreme programming

F
FIFO (computing and electronics) —
File system —
Filename extension —
Finite-state machine —
Firmware —
Formal methods —
Forth —
Fortran —
Forward compatibility —
Functional decomposition —
Functional design —
Functional programming

G
Game development —
Game programming —
Game tester —
GIMP Toolkit —
Graphical user interface

H
Hierarchical database —
High-level language —
Hoare logic —
Human–computer interaction —
Hyperlink —
Hyper-threading

I
IEEE Software —
Imperative programming —
Information technology engineering —
Information systems —
Information technology —
Instruction set —
Interactive programming —
Interface description language —
Intermediate language —
Interpreter —
Invariant —
ISO —
ISO 9000 —
ISO 9001 —
ISO 9660 —
ISO/IEC 12207 —
ISO image —
Iterative development

J
Java —
Java Modeling Language —
Java virtual machine

K
Kernel —
Knowledge management

L
Level design —
Level designer —
LIFO —
Linux —
List of programming languages —
Literate programming

M
Machine code —
Machine language —
Mainframe —
Medical informatics —
Medical software —
Mesh networking —
Metadata (computing) —
Microcode —
Microprogram —
Microsoft Windows —
Minicomputer —
MIPS architecture —
Multi-paradigm programming language

N
Neural network software —
Numerical analysis

O
Object code —
Object database —
Object-oriented programming —
Ontology —
Opcode —
Open implementation —
Open-source software —
Operating system

P
Packet writing —
Pair programming —
Parallax scrolling —
Pascal —
p-code machine —
Perl —
PHP —
Post-object programming —
Privacy Engineering -
Procedural programming —
Processor register —
Program specification —
Programming language —
Programming paradigm —
Programming tool —
Project lifecycle —
Proprietary software —
Python

Q
Qt (toolkit) —
Query optimizer —
Queueing theory

R
Rapid application development —
Rational Unified Process —
Real-time operating system —
Refactoring —
Reflection —
Regression testing —
Relational database —
Release to manufacturing —
Reliability engineering —
Requirement —
Requirements analysis —
Revision control —
Robotics

S
Scripting language —
Second-system effect —
Signal analysis —
Simulation —
Software —
Software architecture —
Software bloat —
Software brittleness —
Software componentry —
Software configuration management —
Software development cycle —
Software development process —
Software engineering —
Software framework —
Software maintenance —
Software metric —
Source code —
Source lines of code —
Specification language —
Sprite —
SQL —
Standard data model —
SCAMPI —
Stack (abstract data type) —
Static code analysis —
Static single-assignment form —
Statistical package —
String —
Structured programming —
Structured Query Language —
Subroutine —
Supercomputer —
Systems architect —
Systems development life cycle —
Systems design —
SPICE (ISO15504)

T
Tcl —
Texture mapping —
Theory of computation —
Think aloud protocol —
Thread —
Threaded code —
Three-address code —
Timeboxing —
TinyOS

U
UCSD p-System —
Unix —
Usability —
Usability testing —
User interface

V
Video games —
Virtual finite-state machine —
Visual Basic (classic) —
Visual Basic .NET

W
Waterfall model —
Wiki —
Windows —
Windows Vista

X
Xerox PARC —

Y
YouTube —

Z
Z notation —

Topics (alphabetical)
Software engineering topics (alphabetical)
Software engineering topics (alphabetical)